Anima is the fourth album by Finnish producer Sasu Ripatti under the name Vladislav Delay.

It consists of a single track.  Ripatti reissued the album on his own Huume label in 2008 with a bonus 10-minute mix.

Track listing
 "Anima" (62:02)

References 

2001 albums
Vladislav Delay albums